Two ships of the Royal Navy have borne the name HMS Captivity.  In both cases they were old ships that had been renamed after their conversion to prison ships:

She became a prison ship and was renamed HMS Captivity in 1796. She was broken up in 1816.
She became a prison ship in 1815 and was renamed HMS Captivity in 1824. She was sold in 1836.

Royal Navy ship names